Junkermann is a German surname. Notable people with the surname include:

 Hans Junkermann (1934–2022), retired German cyclist
 Ilse Junkermann (born 1957), German Lutheran bishop
 Nicole Junkermann, (born 1980) German entrepreneur and investor married to Ferdinando Brachetti Peretti
 Otto Junkermann (1929–2016), American politician

References

German-language surnames